JBL is an American audio equipment manufacturer headquartered in Los Angeles, California, United States. JBL serves the customer home and professional market. The professional market includes studios, installed/tour/portable sound, cars, music production, DJ, cinema markets, etc. JBL is owned by Harman International. a wholly owned bySamsung Electronics.

JBL was founded by James Bullough Lansing (1902–1949), an American audio engineer and loudspeaker designer best known for establishing two audio companies that bear his name, Altec Lansing and JBL, the latter taken from his initials.

History
Lansing and his business partner Ken Decker started a company in 1927, in Los Angeles, manufacturing six- and eight-inch speaker drivers for radio consoles and radio sets. The firm was named Lansing Manufacturing Company, from March 1, 1927.

In 1933, head of the Metro-Goldwyn-Mayer (MGM) sound department, Douglas Shearer, dissatisfied with the loudspeakers of Western Electric and RCA, decided to develop his own. John Hilliard, Robert Stephens, and John F. Blackburn were part of the team that developed the Shearer Horn, with Lansing Manufacturing producing the 285 compression driver and the 15XS bass driver. The Shearer Horn gave the desired improvements and Western Electric and RCA received the contracts to each build 75 units. Western Electric named them Diaphonics, and RCA used them in their RCA Photophones. Lansing Manufacturing was the only firm selling them as Shearer Horns. In 1936, the Shearer Horn received the Academy Scientific and Technical Award from the Academy of Motion Picture Arts and Sciences.

Based on the experience developed with the Shearer Horn, Lansing produced the Iconic System loudspeaker for cinemas. The Iconic was a two-way speaker using a 15-inch woofer for the low frequencies and a compression driver for the highs.

In 1939, Decker was killed in an airplane crash, the company soon began having financial troubles and, in 1941, Lansing Manufacturing Company was bought by Altec Service Corporation, after which the name changed to "Altec Lansing". After Lansing's contract expired in 1946, he left Altec Lansing and founded Lansing Sound in which later the name changed to "James B. Lansing Sound" and was further shortened to "JBL Sound".

In 1946, JBL produced their first products, the model D101 15-inch loudspeaker and the model D175 high-frequency driver. The D175 remained in the JBL catalog through the 1970s. Both of these were near-copies of Altec Lansing products. The first original product was the D130, a 15-inch transducer for which a variant remained in production for the next 55 years. The D130 featured a four-inch flat ribbon wire voice coil and Alnico V magnet. Two other products were the 12-inch D131 and the 8-inch D208 cone drivers.

The Marquardt Corporation gave the company early manufacturing space and a modest investment.  William H. Thomas, the treasurer of Marquardt Corporation, represented Marquardt on Lansing's board of directors.  In 1948, Marquardt took over operation of JBL.  In 1949, Marquardt was purchased by General Tire Company.  The new company, not interested in the loudspeaker business, severed ties with Lansing.  Lansing reincorporated as James B. Lansing and moved the newly formed company to its first private location, on 2439 Fletcher Drive, Los Angeles.

A key to JBL's early development was Lansing's close business relationship with its primary supplier of Alnico V magnetic material, Robert Arnold of Arnold Engineering. Arnold saw JBL as an opportunity to sell Alnico V magnetic materials into a new market.

Lansing was noted as an innovative engineer, but a poor businessman. Decker, his business partner, had died in 1939 in an airplane crash. In the late 1940s, Lansing struggled to pay invoices and ship product.  Possibly as a result of deteriorating business conditions and personal issues, he committed suicide on September 4, 1949.  The company then passed into the hands of Bill Thomas, JBL's vice-president. Lansing had taken out a $10,000 life insurance policy, naming the company as the beneficiary, a decision that allowed Thomas to continue the company after Lansing's death.  Soon after, Thomas purchased Mrs. Lansing's one-third interest in the company and became the sole owner.  Thomas is credited with revitalizing the company and spearheading a period of strong growth for the two decades following the founding of JBL.

Early products included the model 375 high-frequency driver and the 075 ultra high frequency (UHF) ring-radiator driver.  The ring-radiator drivers are also known as "JBL bullets" because of their distinctive shape.  The 375 was a re-invention of the Western Electric 594 driver but with an Alnico V magnet and a four-inch voice coil.  The 375 shared the same basic magnet structure as the D-130 woofer.  JBL engineers Ed May and Bart N. Locanthi created these designs.

Two products from that era, the Hartsfield and the Paragon, continue to be highly desired on the collectors' market.

In 1955, the brand name JBL was introduced to resolve ongoing disputes with Altec Lansing Corporation.  The company name "James B. Lansing Sound, Incorporated", was retained, but the logo name was changed to JBL with its distinctive exclamation point.

The JBL 4320 series studio monitor was introduced through Capitol Records in Hollywood and became the standard monitor worldwide for its parent company, EMI.  JBL's introduction to rock and roll music came via the adoption of the D130 loudspeaker by Leo Fender's Fender Guitar Company as the ideal driver for electric guitars.

In 1969, Thomas sold JBL to the Jervis Corporation (later renamed "Harman International"), headed by Sidney Harman. The 1970s saw JBL become a household brand, starting with the famous L-100, which was the bestselling loudspeaker model of any company to that time. The 1970s were also a time of major JBL expansion in the professional audio field from their studio monitors. By 1977, more recording studios were using JBL monitors than all other brands combined, according to a Billboard survey.  The JBL L-100 and 4310 control monitors were popular home speakers.  In the late 1970s, the new L-series designs L15, L26, L46, L56, L86, L96, L112, L150, and later the L150A and flagship L250 were introduced with improved crossovers, ceramic magnet woofers, updated midrange drivers, and aluminum-deposition phenolic resin tweeters. In the mid-1980s the designs were again updated and redesigned with a new titanium-deposition tweeter diaphragm. The new L-series designations being the L20T, L40T, L60T, L80T, L100T, the Ti-series 18Ti, 120Ti, 240Ti, and the flagship 250Ti. To test speaker drivers, JBL in Glendale and Northridge used the roof as an outdoor equivalent to an anechoic chamber.

Over the next two decades, JBL went more mass-market with their consumer (Northridge) line of loudspeakers. At the same time, they made an entry into the high-end market with their project speakers, consisting of the Everest and K2 lines. JBL became a prominent supplier to the tour sound industry, their loudspeakers being employed by touring rock acts and music festivals. JBL products were the basis for the development of THX loudspeaker standard, which resulted in JBL becoming a popular cinema loudspeaker manufacturer.

JBL was formerly used in Ford's top-of-the-line vehicle audio systems, as competition for Chrysler (whose cars used Infinity) and Nissan (who used Bose).

Timeline
1902 – Birth of James B. Lansing in Illinois, U.S.
1927 – Founding of Lansing Manufacturing Company in Los Angeles
1934 – Douglas Shearer from MGM designs the first speaker for the cinema. Lansing builds system components.
1941 – Altec Service Company acquires Lansing Manufacturing Company
1944 – Lansing and Hilliard redefine the reference theater speaker with model A-4, renamed Voice of the Theatre
1946 – Lansing leaves Altec and founds a new company, James B. Lansing Sound Inc.
1947 – JBL has a 15" speaker (38 cm), model D-130, using for the first time a 4" (100 mm) voice coil in a speaker cone
1949 – James. B. Lansing dies of suicide; William Thomas became president of the company
1954 – The 375 compression engine is the first 4-inch engine sold; its response extends to 9 kHz
1954 – Presentation of acoustic lenses developed by Bart N. Locanthi
1955 – Leo Fender integrates the D-130 model in their amplifiers, thus starting the entry of JBL into professional music
1958 – Introduction of JBL Paragon stereo speaker system
1962 – JBL creates the first 2-way studio monitor, using a high-frequency motor lens
1968 – JBL launches the 3-way speaker 4310
1969 – Sidney Harman acquires JBL
1969 – L-100, a consumer version of the 4311 is launched; it would sell over 125,000 pairs in the 70s
1969 – JBL components deliver sound at Woodstock and many other rock festivals
1973 – 4300 Series launched, including the first 4-way speaker
1975 – 4682 Model Line Array Strongbox
1979 – Technology diamond surround for control of high frequency resonances in
1979 – Development of Symmetrical Field Geometry (SFG)
1980 – Pavilion Bi-Radial Constant dispersion technology
1981 – The first Bi-Radial monitor, 4400 for the recording studio
1982 – Titanium is used as a material for compression engines
1984 – JBL acquires UREI
1986 – The first models of Control series introduced
1990 – Vented Gap Cooling technology (reduces low frequencies transducer temperature)
1991 – The first pro-audio speaker based on neodymium with Array Series
1995 – Birth of EON system
1995 – First Neodymium Differential Drive speaker
1996 – Creation of the HLA standard with Line Array Space Frame design
1999 – JBL used at Woodstock 1999
2000 – Creation of VerTec Line Array system
2000 – Birth of EVO, the intelligent loudspeaker controlled by DSP
2002 – VerTec is used for the Super Bowl, the Grammy Awards and the ceremony of the 2002 FIFA World Cup (Seoul, Korea)

Portable Bluetooth speakers currently being produced (as of 2022)  
JBL JR Pop
JBL Go 2
JBL Go 3
JBL Clip 3
JBL Clip 4
JBL Flip 4
JBL Flip 5
JBL Flip 5 Eco Edition
JBL Flip 6
JBL Pulse 4
JBL Pulse 5
JBL Charge 4
JBL Charge 5
JBL Xtreme 3
JBL Boombox 2

Party speakers currently being produced (as of 2022) 
JBL PartyBox On-The-Go
JBL PartyBox 110
JBL PartyBox 310
JBL PartyBox 710
JBL PartyBox 1000
JBL PartyBox Encore Essential

Product line examples

Examples of applications
 Academy of Motion Picture Arts and Sciences - AMPAS (Samuel Goldwyn Theater, Hollywood, United States).
 Institut de Recherche et de Coordination Acoustique/Musique - IRCAM (Pierre Boulez, Paris, France, 1974–1991).
 Digital Cinema Project - GAUMONT (Philippe Binant, Paris, France, 2000–2008).

See also
 List of studio monitor manufacturers

References

External links

 

 
1946 establishments in California
Audio amplifier manufacturers
Audio equipment manufacturers of the United States
Harman International
Headphones manufacturers
Loudspeaker manufacturers
Manufacturers of professional audio equipment
In-car entertainment
Manufacturing companies established in 1946